The School for Infantry Corps Professions and Squad Commanders (Hebrew: Beit HaSefer LiMfakdei Kitot UMiktzo'ot Heil HaRaglim, best known by its acronym Bislamach). is the IDF body responsible for the training of all Infantry Corps squad commanders and platoon sergeants.

Established in 1974 under the command of Yaakov Hasdai,  the school comprises three operative battalions (17th, 906th, and 450th), ordinarily used for training. During wars or emergencies, as was the case during the Yom Kippur War, these serve as fully operational combat forces. Since 2006 these battalions form the 828th Brigade (formerly 772th Brigade), referred to as the Bislamach Brigade (formerly called Bislach Brigade).

The brigade has three bases, all located in the Negev.

Before Operation Rainbow, during the Al-Aqsa Intifada, the brigade's soldiers participated in searching the Philadelphi Route for the bodies of the soldiers from the Sayeret Yahalom, who were killed during the armoured personnel carrier disaster of May 11–12, 2004. They also took part in the Gaza disengagement plan, following which they were the first to hold the border with the Gaza Strip.

References

Brigades of Israel
Military installations of Israel
Military units and formations established in 1974